The effects of Hurricane Charley in North Carolina were minor to moderate and included $25 million (2004 USD) in damage. Hurricane Charley lasted from August 9 to August 15, 2004, and at peak intensity it attained  winds, making it a strong Category 4 hurricane on the Saffir-Simpson Hurricane Scale. The storm made landfall in southwestern Florida at maximum strength, and moved northward, parallel to the U.S. East Coast before moving ashore on northeastern South Carolina.

No deaths are attributed to the storm.

Preparations 

On August 13, 2004, a tropical storm watch was issued for Cape Fear, southward to South Carolina. The watch was extended northward to Oregon Inlet later that day; the watch further extended to Chincoteague, Virginia. The tropical storm watch from Cape Lookout to Oregon Inlet was changed to a hurricane warning. A hurricane watch was subsequently put into effect for coastal areas from Oregon Inlet to the North Carolina/Virginia border, although by August 15 all advisories were discontinued. Flood watches were also placed into effect for portions of the state.

Governor Mike Easley declared a state of emergency in advance of the storm, and 200 National Guard troops were dispatched to Charlotte, Raleigh, Kinston and Lumerton, while 800 more were on standby. On Ocracoke Island, authorities ordered mandatory evacuations, while on Bogue Banks voluntary evacuations were in place. Officials in Wrightsville Beach drove along the streets with loudspeakers mounted on trucks, warning tourists that a storm was approaching. The storm forced the University of North Carolina at Wilmington to suspend a planned opening for students moving into residence halls. Campgrounds at the Cape Hatteras National Seashore were closed by the National Park Service and three boat ramps were closed. Duke Power Co. prepared for Charley by lowering the level of hydroelectric lakes to make room for excessive rainfall. The state Department of Environment and Natural Resources advised hog farmers to pump out their waste lagoon. About 60 Red Cross shelters were opened during the storm and during the peak of Charley, and roughly 1,600 people sought protection.

Impact 

The outer rainbands began affecting the region in the early hours of August 14. Due to widespread debris, storm drains became clogged which left flooding in some areas. Freshwater flooding was reported in seven counties along the coastal plain. State highways 42 and 581, as well as numerous county and local roads, were covered with at least  of water. Wilmington and surrounding towns were forced to close a total of 20 streets. The heavy precipitation also caused the Neuse River to swell to flood stage. A few businesses throughout the region were damaged; two in downtown Greenville and five others were flooded.

However, there were isolated reports of  surge, particularly along the beaches of Brunswick County. This produced minor beach erosion along the coastline. The hurricane spawned five weak tornadoes across the state, including an F1 in Nags Head that damaged twenty structures. Charley destroyed 40 houses and damaged 2,231, 231 severely, including 221 damaged beach homes in Sunset Beach. The winds blew down chimneys and damaged a roof on one building, and ripped the siding off another. Crop damage was also heavy in Brunswick County, with 50% of the tobacco crop lost and 30% of the corn and vegetable fields destroyed. Strong winds downed trees and power lines, leaving 65,000 homes without power. Damage in North Carolina totaled to $25 million (2004 USD).

See also 

 List of North Carolina hurricanes (1980–present)

References 

Charley (2004)
North Carolina
2004 in North Carolina
Charley
Charley North Carolina